Yegor Nikolayevich Kryshtafovich (born 17 October 1980) is a Russian former professional footballer.

Club career
He played 7 seasons in the Russian Football National League for FC Baltika Kaliningrad.

References

External links
 

1980 births
Living people
Russian footballers
Association football defenders
FK Inkaras Kaunas players
FC Baltika Kaliningrad players
FC Tosno players
A Lyga players
Russian expatriate footballers
Expatriate footballers in Lithuania